The 2018–19 Troy Trojans women's basketball team represents Troy University during the 2018–19 NCAA Division I women's basketball season. The Trojans, led by sixth year head coach Chanda Rigby, play their home games at Trojan Arena and were members of the Sun Belt Conference. They finished the season 22–9, 13–5 in Sun Belt play to finish in third place. They lost in the quarterfinals of the Sun Belt Tournament to South Alabama. They received an at-large bid to the WNIT where they lost to UAB in the first round.

Preseason

Sun Belt coaches poll
On October 24, 2018, the Sun Belt released their preseason coaches poll with the Trojans predicted to finish in second place in the conference.

Sun Belt Preseason All-Conference team

1st team

Kayla Robinson – JR, Guard

2nd team

Sky'Lynn Holmes – SR, Forward
Amber Rivers – JR, Forward

Roster

Schedule

|-
!colspan=9 style=|  Exhibition

|-
!colspan=9 style=| Non-conference regular season

|-
!colspan=9 style=| Sun Belt regular season

|-
!colspan=9 style=| Sun Belt Women's Tournament

|-
!colspan=9 style=| WNIT

Rankings
2018–19 NCAA Division I women's basketball rankings

See also
 2018–19 Troy Trojans men's basketball team

References

Troy Trojans women's basketball seasons
Troy
Troy